The Pasir Gudang City Council (MBPG; , Jawi: مجليس بندارايا ڤاسير ڬودڠ) is the city council which administrates Pasir Gudang in Johor Bahru District, Johor, Malaysia. This agency is under Johor state government. MBPG is responsible for public health and sanitation, waste removal and management, town planning, environmental protection and building control, social and economic development and general maintenance functions of urban infrastructure. The MBPG main headquarters is located at Pasir Gudang.

History 
Formerly known as Pihak Berkuasa Tempatan Pasir Gudang (PBTPG) (Pasir Gudang Local Authority) a subsidiary of Johor Corporation (JCorp).  It is the first local authority in Malaysia that was privatised, although Johor Corporation is the investment arm of the Johor State Government. This agency was granted municipal status on 2 August 2010 and named Pasir Gudang Municipal Council (MPPG). On 22 November 2020, it was upgraded to city council called Pasir Gudang City Council (MBPG).

Departments 
Finance & Administration (Kewangan & Pentadbiran)
Corporate & Public Relations (Korporat & Perhubungan Awam)
Treasury (Perbendaharaan)
Contract & Quantity Survey (Kontrak & Ukur Bahan)
Enforcement (Penguatkuasaan)
Urban Services (Perkhidmatan Bandar)
Information Technology (Teknologi Maklumat)
Building (Bangunan)
Engineering (Kejuruteraan)
Social & Community (Kemasyarakatan)
Management Services (Khidmat Pengurusan)
Property Management (Pengurusan Harta)
Valuation (Penilaian)
Urban Planning (Perancangan Bandar)

Administration areas (Zone)
Pasir Gudang Parliament Constitution
Air Biru 1
Air Biru 2
Air Biru 3
Mawar
Dahlia
Cendana
Nusa Damai
Taman Scientex
Flora Heights
Tebrau Parliament Constitution
Pasir Putih
Tanjung Puteri Resort
Kota Masai 1
Kota Masai 2
Kota Masai 3
Kopok
Cahaya Baru
Kong Kong
Air Putih
Sungai Tiram
Bandar Seri Alam
Masai

See also
 Johor Bahru City Council
 Iskandar Puteri City Council

References

External links 

Former MPPG official website 

1977 establishments in Malaysia
Pasir Gudang
Pasir Gudang
City councils in Malaysia